Hong Jin-young (born August 9, 1985) is a South Korean trot singer and entertainer. She was a member of the short-lived South Korean girl group SWAN, which debuted in 2007. In 2009, she returned to the music scene, debuting as a trot singer. She is known for her vocal ability, signature aegyo, appearances on many variety programs, and prevalence at events throughout South Korea all year round.

Career

2006–2008: Career beginnings
Hong made her debut in small film and television roles. In 2006, she had a small part in the movie Who Slept With Her? (누가 그녀와 잤을까) and she also played a role in Yeon Gaesomun, a historical Korean drama that takes place in the seventh century.

Hong began her music career in 2007, with SWAN (스완), a Korean girl group consisting of members, Han Ji-na, Hong Jin-young, Heo Yoon-mi, and Kim Yeon-ji, with their debut song "Call Me When You Hear This Song" (이 노래 들으면 전화해), featuring Coolapika.

2009–present: Solo career
In 2009, her agency (CCM) CEO suggested her to switch to become a solo trot singer, a suggestion she initially resisted given her young age, as trot is regarded as an "older" genre of music in Korea. Nonetheless, she released her first digital single, "Love Battery" (사랑의 배터리). On August 6, 2010, she returned with a new digital single entitled, "My Love". On June 30, 2011, Hong along with many of South Korea's rising stars sang at the Changwon Sports Complex in a concert called "Changwon's First Anniversary Hope Concert, We Are". On March 22, 2013, she returned with the release of the digital single, "Boogie Man" (부기맨). During the year 2014, she had parted ways from Core Contents Media alongside Davichi.

Hong is well known for her multiple appearances on popular music variety shows like Immortal Songs 2 and King of Mask Singer. In 2014, she was a panelist and also in a virtual marriage with Namkoong Min on a popular variety show, We Got Married. In November of that year, Hong released her first EP, Life Note (인생노트) with the title song “Cheer Up” (산다는 건). Her virtual husband, Namkoong Min, appeared as her love interest in the music video in a cameo role.

In 2016, she released her second EP, The Most Beautiful Moment in Life (화양연화), with the title song “Thumb Up” (엄지 척) and “Love Wifi” (사랑의 와이파이). She also released a cover of a well-known Chinese song called “The Moon Represents My Heart” (月亮代表我的心/월량대표아적심). For the Korean remake, Hong wrote the lyrics herself.

In February 2017, Hong released a digital single called “Loves Me, Loves Me Not” (사랑한다 안한다) from “A Fabricated City” (조작된 도시) OST.

In 2017, Hong was cast as a regular member of Sister's Slam Dunk. She was assigned as a rapper by the producers as it has been Hong's dream to become a rapper for a group, and she received direction from group leader Minzy and Jeon So-mi wrote the rap lyrics for their single, "Right?" (맞지?).

Hong collaborated with comedian Kim Young-chul to release the electrot (EDM and trot) single "Ring Ring" (따르릉) on April 20, 2017, for which they won Best Trot at the 2017 MelOn Music Awards.

In 2018, Hong released a retro trot style digital single, "Good Bye" (잘가라), composed by her long-time collaborator Jo Young-soo (who also composed “Love Battery” and “Cheer Up”) and well-known K-pop lyricist Kim Eana. She wrote and composed a second electrot single "I Kicked My Luck Off" (복을 발로 차버렸어) for Kang Ho-dong, which was released through SM Station. In December 2018, Hong released a trot single about people and experiences in Seoul, entitled "Seoul" (서울사람), a collaboration with rapper Bray (브레이) which she produced with Park Keun-tae (박근태).

In January 2019, Hong released a digital single, a ballad titled "Love Is…" (사랑은 다 이러니). On 12 January 2019, Hong made her U.S. concert debut at the Pechanga Resort & Casino in California, to an audience of over 3,000. In March 2019, Hong finally released her first studio album, titled Lots of Love (랏츠 오브 러브).  She often appears on the KBS 1TV 'Golden Oldies'.

On March 21, 2022, Hong's agency announced that has finished recording a new song and filmed a music video as well. After the announcement, on April 6, 2022 the single "Viva La Vida" was released with both Korean and English versions of the song and video.

On November 1, 2022, Hong's agency announced that the release of "You are there" has been postponed from November 3rd to November 11th due to the Seoul Halloween crowd crush.

Education
Hong holds a Bachelor of Commerce from Chosun University. She also received a master's degree in Trade in 2009 and a PhD degree in Business Administration in 2012 from the same university, which were both revoked in 2020 due to plagiarism.

Plagiarism
On November 5, 2020, Hong was accused of plagiarizing her Master of Trade's thesis after scoring 74 percent on the plagiarism review site "Copy Killer". On the same day, her agency released a statement denying all accusations, stating her thesis was "under review in 2009" and that "Copy Killer is a system that began obligatory use in universities beginning 2015 and is meant to filter out submissions with more than 50 percent plagiarized content. It is inevitable that a thesis that was reviewed in 2009 when the system did not exist would come out with a high score."

On November 6, 2020, Hong released another statement after the accusation continued to spread. In her statement released through her personal Instagram, she stated that "I've decided to give up my master's and doctoral degrees. I think that is the best thing that I can do at this moment."

On December 15, 2020, the Research Integrity Committee under the Chosun University Ethics Committee made the tentative judgement of plagiarism regarding Hong's master's thesis and come to a conclusion that the thesis may be plagiarized. The committee later referred the case to the Graduate School Committee, which had given Hong until 5 PM KST on December 18 to submit a written explanation, before making a final decision to determine if the plagiarism took place through a meeting which will be held on December 23. If the meeting determines that she plagiarized, then both her master's and doctoral degrees will be cancelled automatically.

On December 18, 2020, Hong released another statement through her personal Instagram, stating that she will accept Chosun University's tentative conclusion of plagiarism and she admitted to plagiarizing her thesis.

On December 23, 2020, Chosun University Graduate School Committee confirmed that Hong masters thesis was plagiarized and accordingly all her postgraduate degrees obtained from the university would be revoked.

Discography

Studio albums

Extended plays

Singles

Collaborations

Soundtrack appearances

Compilation appearances

Writer and composer
 "Ring Ring" (따르릉) sung by Kim Young-chul (2017)
 "I Kicked My Luck Off" (복을 발로 차버렸어) sung by Kang Ho-dong (2018)

Filmography

Film

Television series

Television show

Awards and nominations

Listicles

Notes

References

External links

 
 Official YouTube Channel

1985 births
Living people
MBK Entertainment artists
Trot singers
South Korean Buddhists
South Korean film actresses
South Korean television actresses
South Korean female idols
South Korean singer-songwriters
MAMA Award winners
Melon Music Award winners
21st-century South Korean singers
21st-century South Korean women singers
South Korean women singer-songwriters
People involved in plagiarism controversies